The 2019 Silicon Valley Classic (also known as the Mubadala Silicon Valley Classic for sponsorship reasons) was a professional tennis tournament played on hard courts. It was the 48th edition of the tournament, and part of the WTA Premier tournaments of the 2019 WTA Tour. It took place between 29 July and 4 August 2019 in San Jose, California. It was the first women's event on the 2019 US Open Series.

Points and prize money

Point distribution

Prize money

Singles main-draw entrants

Seeds

 Rankings are as of July 22, 2019.

Other entrants
The following players received wildcards into the singles main draw:
  Daria Kasatkina
  Bethanie Mattek-Sands
  CoCo Vandeweghe
 Venus Williams

The following players received entry from the qualifying draw:
  Kristie Ahn
  Tímea Babos 
  Mayo Hibi
  Harmony Tan

Withdrawals
  Petra Martić → replaced by  Misaki Doi
  Garbiñe Muguruza → replaced by  Marie Bouzková
  Jeļena Ostapenko → replaced by  Heather Watson
  Wang Qiang → replaced by  Madison Brengle

Doubles main-draw entrants

Seeds

1 Rankings are as of July 22, 2019.

Finals

Singles

  Zheng Saisai defeated  Aryna Sabalenka, 6−3, 7−6(7−3)

Doubles

  Nicole Melichar /  Květa Peschke defeated  Shuko Aoyama /  Ena Shibahara, 6−4, 6−4

References

External links
Official website

2019 WTA Tour
2019
Sports in San Jose, California
Tennis tournaments in California
2019 in sports in California
2019 in American tennis
July 2019 sports events in the United States
August 2019 sports events in the United States